Union Sportive Ferrals XIII  are a French Rugby league club based in Ferrals-les-Corbières, Aude in the Languedoc-Roussillon region. The play in the National Division 1. They play their home games at the Stade de la Fontaine.

History 

In 1977, they finished runner-up in the old 2nd Division, now called the National Division 1 losing to Saint-Cyprien in the final 15-16. The club had to wait until season 2014/15 for their next tilt at success. At the end of that season, after winning the Paul Dejean Cup and the league, they then won the league Grand final against Villeghailhenc-Aragon XIII but turned down promotion to Elite Two stating the club wasn't ready. The following season, they once again reached the Paul Dejean Cup final, beating US Entraigues XIII and after finishing second in the league, play-off wins over US Trentels XIII and Tonneins XIII saw them reach a second consecutive final. In the final against league winners US Entraigues, they won 34-20, this time accepting promotion to the Elite Two Championship for the first time. In 2015, the club became Elite One Championship side Lézignan Sangliers feeder team.

Current squad 
Squad for 2019-20 season;
Doryan Alran - 
Noel Andreuccetti - 
William Arnaud - 
Simon-Pierre Balmigere - 
Guillaume Bandinelli - 
Gauthier Baptisat - 
Nick Galef - 
Thyl Briand - 
William Canet - 
Dylan Cardace - 
Vincent Cassagneau - 
Pierre Caussinus - 
Anthony Deleigne - 
Louis Dumas - 
Leo Dumontet - 
Adam Eddiche - 
Thomas Estebanez - 
Maxime Honrubia - 
Remi Kasprzak - 
Guillaume Lelong - 
Benjamin Lezina - 
Dylan Marc - 
Gael Maurin - 
Vincent Mirande - 
Vincent Olive - 
Julian Pages - 
Paul Pages - 
Thomas Paoli - 
Laurent Pedregosa 
Quentin Rico - 
Mattis Roudil - 
Jerome Roux - 
Eric Sans - 
Clement Valls - 
Feyyaz Yildirim -

Notable players

 Damien Cardace

Honours 

 National Division 1 (2): 2014/15, 2015/16
 Paul Dejean Cup (2): 2015, 2016

References

External links

French rugby league teams
Sport in Aude